Tarlan (also Romanized as Ţarlān and  Tarlān; also known as Tardād, Tardān, and Thardān) is a village in Amiriyeh Rural District, in the Central District of Arak County, Markazi Province, Iran. At the 2006 census, its population was 571, in 161 families.

References 

Populated places in Arak County